Ricardo Bitancort  (21 April 1972 – 1 March 2002) was a Uruguayan footballer.

International career
Bitancort made one appearance for the senior Uruguay national football team, a friendly against Germany on 13 October 1993.

Death
Bittancort was stabbed to death by a teenager in Montevideo after a fight broke out at a dance.

References

External links
 

1972 births
2002 deaths
Footballers from Montevideo
Uruguayan footballers
Uruguay international footballers
Uruguayan expatriate footballers
Uruguayan Primera División players
Cerro Porteño players
Danubio F.C. players
Club Nacional de Football players
Rampla Juniors players
Juventud de Las Piedras players
Expatriate footballers in Paraguay
Male murder victims
People murdered in Uruguay
Uruguayan murder victims
2002 murders in Uruguay
Association football midfielders
Deaths by stabbing